Deniliquin was an electoral district of the Legislative Assembly in the Australian state of New South Wales, named after and including the town of Deniliquin.

History
Prior to 1894 the town of Deniliquin was part of the district of The Murray which returned two members. Multi-member constituencies were abolished in the 1893 redistribution, resulting in the creation of 76 new districts, including Deniliquin. Deniliquin consisted of parts of The Murray, Balranald and The Murrunbidgee.

Deniliquin was expanded to include part of The Murray in 1904 as a result of the 1903 New South Wales referendum which reduced the number of members of the Legislative Assembly from 125 to 90.

The district was abolished in 1913, with the majority of the district, including the town of Deniliquin being absorbed by The Murray and the eastern part being absorbed by Corowa.

Members for Deniliquin

Election results

References

Former electoral districts of New South Wales
Constituencies established in 1894
Constituencies disestablished in 1913
1894 establishments in Australia
1913 disestablishments in Australia